Henry Richards (born 14 September 1967) is a New Zealand former cricketer. He played in one first-class match for Canterbury in 1987/88.

See also
 List of Canterbury representative cricketers

References

External links
 

1967 births
Living people
New Zealand cricketers
Canterbury cricketers
People from Darfield, New Zealand
Cricketers from Canterbury, New Zealand